The 1927 Creighton Bluejays football team was an American football team that represented Creighton University as a member of the North Central Conference (NCC) during the 1927 college football season. In its fifth season under head coach Chet A. Wynne, the team compiled a 6–1–1 record (2–0 against NCC opponents) and outscored opponents by a total of 103 to 46. The team played its home games at Creighton Stadium in Omaha, Nebraska.

Schedule

References

Creighton
Creighton Bluejays football seasons
North Central Conference football champion seasons
Creighton Bluejays football